Mario Veitía (1910 – death date unknown) was a Cuban third baseman in the Negro leagues in the 1930s.

A native of Remedios, Cuba, Veitía played for the Cuban Stars (East) in 1936. In three recorded games, he posted seven hits in 15 plate appearances.

References

External links
Baseball statistics and player information from Baseball-Reference Black Baseball Stats and Seamheads

Date of birth missing
Year of death missing
Place of death missing
Cuban Stars (East) players
1910 births
Cuban baseball players
Baseball third basemen
People from Remedios, Cuba